Sisyra is a genus of lacewings in the family Sisyridae. There are at least 8 described species in Sisyra.

Species
 Sisyra amazonica Penny, 1981
 Sisyra apicalis Banks, 1908
 Sisyra ariasi Penny, 1981
 Sisyra elongata Penny and Rafael, 1982
 Sisyra minuta Esben-Petersen, 1935
 Sisyra nigra (Retzius, 1783)
 Sisyra panama Parfin and Gurney, 1956
 Sisyra vicaria (Walker, 1853)

References

 Bowles, David E. (2006). "Spongillaflies (Neuroptera: Sisyridae) of North America with a key to the larvae and adults".
 Penny, Norman D. (1977). "Lista de Megaloptera, Neuroptera e Raphidioptera do México, América Central, ilhas Caraíbas e América do Sul". Acta Amazonica, vol. 7, no. 4, Suplemento, 5-61.
 Penny, Norman D., Philip A. Adams, and Lionel A. Stange (1997). "Species catalog of the Neuroptera, Megaloptera, and Raphidioptera of America North of Mexico". Proceedings of the California Academy of Sciences, vol. 50, no. 3, 39-114.

Further reading

 Arnett, Ross H. (2000). American Insects: A Handbook of the Insects of America North of Mexico. CRC Press.

External links

 NCBI Taxonomy Browser, Sisyra

Hemerobiiformia
Neuroptera genera